Sir John William Taverner  (November 20, 1853 – December 17, 1923) was a politician of the Victorian Legislative Assembly.

Early life and career  
Taverner was educated at Scots Grammar School, Williamstown, and worked his first jobs, cutting thistles, holding a surveyor's chain, and drove for Cobb & Co. He went on to be a senior partner at two firms and the principal of a  stock and station agents company.

He married his wife, Elizabeth Ann Bassett Luxton, on May 23, 1879 in Kerang.

Reference list 

Victorian Ministers for Agriculture
1853 births
1923 deaths
Members of the Victorian Legislative Assembly